The World Tower is a residential skyscraper in Sydney, Australia.

Construction began in 2001 and was completed in 2004. Developed by Meriton, The World Tower was the 2004 Bronze recipient of the Emporis Skyscraper Award, and was briefly Australia's tallest residential building from 2004 to 2006.

The World Tower consists of 75 above-ground levels, 10 basement levels, 15 lifts and 701 residential units. Each of the three residential sections of the building has a pool, spa, sauna, gymnasium, games room, and a private 24-seat theatrette. The pool and spa areas on levels 38 and 61 offer 180° views of Sydney.  There is also a childcare centre located in the building.

Situated at the foot of World Tower is World Square, a shopping complex with a Coles supermarket, several food outlets, and other specialty stores.  Public buses stop outside World Square, and it is close to Town Hall and Museum railway stations.

Scenes for the 1995 film Mighty Morphin Power Rangers: The Movie were shot on the former property of Anthony Hordern & Sons and future site of World Square.

See also

 List of tallest buildings in Australia
 List of tallest buildings in Sydney

References

External links
 World Tower on Emporis.com (General database of skyscrapers)
 World Tower apartments

Skyscrapers in Sydney
Residential skyscrapers in Australia
Apartment buildings in Sydney
Residential buildings completed in 2004
Sydney central business district